Forbes Energy is an energy company based in Alice, Texas. The company operates a facility in the Dominican Republic for the refining and export of Brazilian ethanol to the United States.

References

Alcohol fuel producers